Greigia tillettii is a plant species in the genus Greigia. This species is endemic to Venezuela.

References

tillettii
Flora of Venezuela